Holstein may refer to:

Animal breeds
Holstein Friesian cattle, a cattle breed used in dairy farming
Holsteiner horse, a breed of horse originating in the Schleswig-Holstein region of northern Germany

Places
Schleswig-Holstein, a state in Northern Germany
Holstein, a region in Germany
Duchy of Holstein
Holstein, Ontario, a village in Canada
New Holstein, Wisconsin, United States
Holstein, Iowa, United States
Holstein, Missouri, United States
Holstein, Nebraska, United States
the German name of Pregolskiy, Kaliningrad, Russia
Hölstein, a village in Basel-Landschaft, Switzerland

Danish ships
n.b. In Danish, the spelling of Holstein can be varied as Holsten or Holsteen
Holsten (I) – a ship of the Danish East India Company (1800–1805); originally HDMS Det Store Bælt (1782)
Holsten (II) – a ship of the Danish East India Company (1806–1808); see Warren Hastings (1802 EIC ship)
HDMS Holsteen, a Danish ship-of-the-line

Other
Holstein (station), an Oslo Metro station
Holstein (surname)
Holstein interglacial, a geologic stretch of time
Holstein-Primakoff transformation, a mathematical physics transformation
Pedro de Sousa Holstein, 1st Duke of Palmela (1781–1850), Portuguese diplomat and statesmen

See also
Holston (disambiguation)